Papanteles is a genus of braconid wasps in the family Braconidae. There are at least two described species in Papanteles, found in the Neotropics.

Species
These two species belong to the genus Papanteles:
 Papanteles peckorum Mason, 1981
 Papanteles virbius (Nixon, 1965)

References

Microgastrinae